Orlean may refer to:

 Orlean, Virginia, a village in Fauquier County, Virginia, United States
 Orlean, Altai Krai, a locality in  Altai Krai, Russia
 Orlean (film), a 2015 Russian film
 Susan Orlean, American author and journalist
 Bixa orellana, the achiote or orlean tree

See also
 Orleans (disambiguation)